Amya may refer to:

Amya, Dawei, a village in Dawei District, Taninthayi Division, Myanmar
Amya, Hama, a village located in Al-Saan Subdistrict in Salamiyah District, Hama, Syria
Amya, an alternative and derivative of the Spanish given name and surname Amaya

See also
Amaya (disambiguation)
Amyas, a name